The third season of the American television comedy-drama series Devious Maids premiered on Lifetime on June 1, 2015. The season consisted of 13 episodes. Lifetime renewed the show for a fourth season on September 24, 2015.

Plot
A deranged gunman takes aim at the maids during Rosie and Spence's wedding, leaving everyone to wonder who will survive. In the wake of this tragedy, the women lean on each other like never before, even as they face complex problems in their own lives. Zoila ponders her next steps after discovering that she is pregnant and uncertain who the father may be. Carmen realizes there is more than meets the eye to the charming Sebastien. Meanwhile, Valentina and Remi struggle to connect in the aftermath of the shooting; Marisol's aspirations lead her to a surprising career change; and Blanca, a new maid in the neighborhood, lands a job with a seemingly picture-perfect family, but soon discovers a terrible secret that could change her life forever.

Development
On September 26, 2014, it was announced that the series would return for a third season, set to premiere in 2015. Gilles Marini was added to the cast, in the role of Sebastian, a real estate agent Carmen gets involved with. In January 2015, it was confirmed that Brianna Brown would return to the main cast for the third season. In February 2015, it was reported that Glee actress Naya Rivera had joined the season in the recurring role of Blanca, a maid to a seemingly ideal family, who learns of a life altering secret. Later that month, Days of Our Lives actor Nathan Owens was cast in the regular role of Jesse, a recently returned home military man, and Cristián de la Fuente was cast as Ernesto Falta, Rosie's first husband. In April 2015, it was reported that the previous regulars Drew Van Acker and Edy Ganem had been demoted to recurring roles for the third season.

On March 30, 2015, co-star Ana Ortiz seemingly implied that the third season would be the series' last. However, director/producer David Warren stated on Twitter that the claim was false.

Cast

Main
 Ana Ortiz as Marisol Suarez 
 Dania Ramirez as Rosie Westmore/Falta
 Roselyn Sánchez as Carmen Luna 
 Judy Reyes as Zoila Diaz 
 Rebecca Wisocky as Evelyn Powell 
 Susan Lucci as Genevieve Delatour 
 Tom Irwin as Adrian Powell 
 Grant Show as Spence Westmore 
 Brianna Brown as Taylor Stappord 
 Brett Cullen as Michael Stappord 
 Gilles Marini as Sebastien Dussault 
 Cristián de la Fuente as Ernesto Falta 
 Nathan Owens as Jesse Morgan

Recurring
 Grecia Merino as Katy Stappord
 Alejandro Vera as Miguel Falta 
 John O'Hurley as Dr. Christopher Neff 
 Julie Claire as Gail Fleming 
 Naya Rivera as Blanca Alvarez
 Joy Osmanski as Joy 
 Alec Mapa as Jerry
 Issac Ryan Brown as Deion 
 Michelle Hurd as Jacklyn Dussault 
 Ivan Hernandez as Javier Mendoza
 Antonio Jaramillo as Hector

Guest cast
 Edy Ganem as Valentina Diaz 
 Drew Van Acker as Remi Delatour
 Eddie Mills as Louie Becker
 Justina Machado as Reina 
 Valerie Mahaffey as Olivia Rice 
 Alex Fernandez as Pablo Diaz 
 Mariana Klaveno as Peri Westmore

Episodes

Ratings

U.S. ratings

References

External links
 
 
 
 

Devious Maids
2015 American television seasons